Italia is a brigantine, active as a sail training vessel for the Italian Navy.

It is owned by Fondazione tender to nave Italia, a non-profit foundation for maritime contest development, with property shared by Italian Navy and Yacht Club Italiano.

History 
Built at the shipyard Wiswa, Gdańsk (Poland) as Swan fan Makkum it is a Brigantine.

Named for Willem Sligting, Makkum, christened by Hinke de Vries, co-owner and wife, in a multilingual fashion: English, Polish and Frysian and after the ceremony launched in the river Wisla.

She is the largest brigantine in the world, as well as the largest two masted sailing vessel, with an overall length of 61 metres (200 ft).

Swan fan Makkum was sold February 6, 2007 to Fondazione tender to nave Italia and renamed Nave Italia, commissioned to Italian Navy on 19 March 2007.

She will continue to appear as a competitor in the Tall Ships Race, her first appearance as Nave Italia was in the 2007 Mediterranean series.

Gallery

References

External links
Nave Italia
Yacht Club Italiano

Training ships of the Italian Navy
1993 ships
Ships built in Gdańsk
Tall ships of Italy
Sail training
Brigantines
Naval ships built in Poland for export